Vallonia terraenovae is a species of small, air-breathing land snail, a terrestrial pulmonate gastropod mollusk in the family Valloniidae.

It was described by Gerber in 1996.

Vallonia terraenovae is part of the genus Vallonia and the family of grass snails. No subspecies are listed in the Catalog of Life. The species is part of the Lost Species list prepared by the Global Wildlife Conservation. Its conservation status is Not Evaluated.

References

Valloniidae